John Adams Whipple (September 10, 1822 – April 10, 1891) was an American inventor and early photographer. He was the first in the United States to manufacture the chemicals used for daguerreotypes.  He pioneered astronomical and night photography. He was a prize-winner for his extraordinary early photographs of the moon and he was the first to produce images of stars other than the sun. Among those was the star Vega and the Mizar-Alcor stellar sextuple system, which was thought to be a double star until 2009.

Biography
Whipple was born in Grafton, Massachusetts, to Jonathan and Melinda (Grout) Whipple. While a boy he was an ardent student of chemistry, and on the introduction of the daguerreotype process into the United States (1839–1840) he was the first to manufacture the necessary chemicals. 

His health having become impaired through this work, he devoted his attention to photography. He made his first daguerreotype in the winter of 1840, "using a sun-glass for a lens, a candle box for a camera, and the handle of a silver spoon as a substitute for a plate." Over time he became a prominent daguerreotype portraitist in Boston. In addition to making portraits for the Whipple and Black studio, Whipple photographed important buildings in and around Boston, including the house occupied by General George Washington in 1775 and 1776 (photographed circa 1855, now in the Smithsonian).

Whipple married Elizabeth Mann (1819–1891) on May 12, 1847, in Boston.

Between 1847 and 1852 Whipple and astronomer William Cranch Bond, director of the Harvard College Observatory, used Harvard's Great Refractor telescope to produce images of the moon that are remarkable in their clarity of detail and aesthetic power. This was the largest telescope in the world at that time, and their images of the moon took the prize for technical excellence in photography at the great 1851 Crystal Palace Exhibition in London.

On the night of July 16–17, 1850, Whipple and Bond made the first daguerreotype of a star (Vega). In 1863, Whipple used electric lights to take night photographs of Boston Common.

Whipple was as prolific as an inventor as a photographer. He invented crayon daguerreotypes and crystallotypes (daguerreotypes on glass). With his partner or assistant, William Breed Jones, he developed the process for making paper prints from glass albumen negatives (crystallotypes). His American patents include Patent Number 6,056, the "Crayon Daguerreotype"; Patent Number 7,458, the "Crystallotype" (Credit shared with William B. Jones).

Whipple died suddenly, of pneumonia, on April 10, 1891, in Cambridge, Massachusetts, and was buried at Westborough, Worcester Co., Massachusetts.

Image gallery

Collections of his works
 Boston Athenaeum
 Boston Public Library
 George Eastman House
 Harvard University
 Historic New England
 Massachusetts Historical Society
 Metropolitan Museum of Art
 Smithsonian American Art Museum

References

19th-century American inventors
Astrophotographers
1822 births
1891 deaths
Pioneers of photography
Artists from Boston
People from Grafton, Massachusetts
19th-century American scientists
19th-century American photographers
Harvard College Observatory people